Flashsort is a distribution sorting algorithm showing linear computational complexity  for uniformly distributed data sets and relatively little additional memory requirement. The original work was published in 1998 by Karl-Dietrich Neubert.

Concept 
Flashsort is an efficient in-place implementation of histogram sort, itself a type of bucket sort.  It assigns each of the  input elements to one of  buckets, efficiently rearranges the input to place the buckets in the correct order, then sorts each bucket.  The original algorithm sorts an input array  as follows:
 Using a first pass over the input or a priori knowledge, find the minimum and maximum sort keys.
 Linearly divide the range  into  buckets.
 Make one pass over the input, counting the number of elements  which fall into each bucket.  (Neubert calls the buckets "classes" and the assignment of elements to their buckets "classification".)
 Convert the counts of elements in each bucket to a prefix sum, where  is the number of elements  in bucket  or less.
 Rearrange the input to all elements of each bucket  are stored in positions  where .
 Sort each bucket using insertion sort.

Steps 1–3 and 6 are common to any bucket sort, and can be improved using techniques generic to bucket sorts.  In particular, the goal is for the buckets to be of approximately equal size ( elements each),  with the ideal being division into  quantiles.  While the basic algorithm is a linear interpolation sort, if the input distribution is known to be non-uniform, a non-linear division will more closely approximate this ideal.  Likewise, the final sort can use any of a number of techniques, including a recursive flash sort.

What distinguishes flash sort is step 5: an efficient  in-place algorithm for collecting the elements of each bucket together in the correct relative order using only  words of additional memory.

Memory efficient implementation 
The Flashsort rearrangement phase operates in cycles.  Elements start out "unclassified", then are moved to the correct bucket and considered "classified".  The basic procedure is to choose an unclassified element, find its correct bucket, exchange it with an unclassified element there (which must exist, because we counted the size of each bucket ahead of time), mark it as classified, and then repeat with the just-exchanged unclassified element.  Eventually, the element is exchanged with itself and the cycle ends.

The details are easy to understand using two (word-sized) variables per bucket.  The clever part is the elimination of one of those variables, allowing twice as many buckets to be used and therefore half as much time spent on the final  sorting.

To understand it with two variables per bucket, assume there are two arrays of  additional words:  is the (fixed) upper limit of bucket  (and ), while  is a (movable) index into bucket , so .

Initially  and all elements are unclassified.

Each round begins by finding the first incompletely classified bucket  (which has ) and taking the first unclassified element in that bucket  where .  (Neubert calls this the "cycle leader".)  Copy  to a temporary variable  and repeat:
 Compute the bucket  to which  belongs.
 Let  be the location where  will be stored.
 Decrement  to reflect the fact that  is now correctly classified.
 If , restart this loop with the new .
 If , this round is over and find a new first unclassified element .
 When there are no more unclassified elements, the distribution into buckets is complete.

When implemented with two variables per bucket in this way, the choice of each round's starting point  is in fact arbitrary; any unclassified element may be used as a cycle leader.  The only requirement is that the cycle leaders can be found efficiently.

Although the preceding description uses  to find the cycle leaders, it is in fact possible to do without it, allowing the entire -word array to be eliminated.

It is easy to compute its target bucket . By the loop invariant, it is classified if , and unclassified if  is outside that range. The first inequality is easy to test, but the second appears to require the value .

Consider the bucket  which position  falls into. That is, . I.e. no elements which belong in those buckets remain in the rest of the array. Therefore, it is not possible that .

Then proceed:
 If , the distribution is complete.
 Given , compute the bucket  to which it belongs.
 If , then  is unclassified.  Copy it a temporary variable  and:
 Let  be the location where  will be stored.
 Decrement  to reflect the fact that  is now correctly classified.
 If , compute the bucket  to which  belongs and restart this (inner) loop with the new .
  is now correctly classified.  Increment  and restart the (outer) loop.

While saving memory, Flashsort has the disadvantage that it recomputes the bucket for many already-classified elements.  This is already done twice per element (once during the bucket-counting phase and a second time when moving each element), but searching for the first unclassified element requires a third computation for most elements.  This could be expensive if buckets are assigned using a more complex formula than simple linear interpolation.  A variant reduces the number of computations from almost  to at most  by taking the last unclassified element in an unfinished bucket as cycle leader:
 Maintain a variable  identifying the first incompletely-classified bucket.  Let  to begin with, and when , the distribution is complete.
 Let .  If , increment  and restart this loop.  (.)
 Compute the bucket  to which  belongs.
 If , then  and we are done with bucket .  Increment  and restart this loop.
 If , the classification is trivial.  Decrement  and restart this loop.
 If  , then  is unclassified.  Perform the same classification loop as the previous case, then restart this loop.

Most elements have their buckets computed only twice, except for the final element in each bucket, which is used to detect the completion of the following bucket.  A small further reduction can be achieved by maintaining a count of unclassified elements and stopping when it reaches zero.

Performance 
The only extra memory requirements are the auxiliary vector  for storing bucket bounds and the constant number of other variables used.  Further, each element is moved (via a temporary buffer, so two move operations) only once.  However, this memory efficiency comes with the disadvantage that the array is accessed randomly, so cannot take advantage of a data cache smaller than the whole array.

As with all bucket sorts, performance depends critically on the balance of the buckets.  In the ideal case of a balanced data set, each bucket will be approximately the same size. If the number  of buckets is linear in the input size , each bucket has a constant size, so sorting a single bucket with an  algorithm like insertion sort has complexity .  The running time of the final insertion sorts is therefore .

Variations of the algorithm improve worst-case performance by using better-performing sorts such as quicksort or recursive flashsort on buckets which exceed a certain size limit.

Note that these measurements were taken in the late 1990s, when memory hierarchies were much less dependent on cacheing.

Due to the in situ permutation that flashsort performs in its classification process, flashsort is not stable. If stability is required, it is possible to use a second array so elements can be classified sequentially. However, in this case, the algorithm will require  additional memory.

See also 
 Interpolation search, using the distribution of items for searching rather than sorting

References

External links 
 Implementations of Randomized Sorting on Large Parallel Machines (1992)
 Implementation of Parallel Algorithms (1992)
 Visualization of Flashsort

Sorting algorithms